Adobe Mountain is a peak with an elevation of  in the Diablo Range in Stanislaus County, California.

References  

Mountains of Stanislaus County, California